Jaime Valle Mendez was President of the Autonomous University of San Luis Potosí (UASLP) during the 1995-2004 term.

At UASLP, he began his academic career, becoming a full-time professor in 1962 at the School of Engineering. He was Chair of the Mechanical and Electrical Engineering Program (1968–69), Dean of the School of Engineering (1984–1988), and Provost of the University (1988–1994).

Valle has been actively involved in linkages with the business sector, as Director of CYPESA, member of the Board of Directors in the Manufacturing Industry Chamber of San Luis Potosí and Vice President of the organization. Valle holds a bachelor's degree in engineering from the UASLP, and a specialty in business administration from the Université de Paris.  He has pursued graduate studies in business administration at the UASLP.

After his retirement as President, Valle continues teaching at the School of Engineering, and collaborates as consultant with universities and the government.

References

 http://www.uaslp.mx

People from San Luis Potosí City
University of Paris alumni
Heads of universities and colleges in Mexico
Living people
Year of birth missing (living people)